is a former Japanese football player and manager. he is current assistant manager J1 League club of Kyoto Sanga.

Playing career
Nagasawa was born in Osaka Prefecture on May 28, 1968, but was raised in Matsuyama. After graduating from University of Tsukuba, he joined Yamaha Motors (later Júbilo Iwata) in 1991. He played as midfielder and right side back. In 1993, the club won the 2nd place and was promoted to J1 League from 1994. However his opportunity to play decreased in 1994. In 1995, he moved to Japan Football League club Honda. He became a regular player and played many matches until 1996. However he could hardly play in the match in 1997 and he retired end of 1997 season.

Coaching career
After retirement, Nagasawa started coaching career at Honda in 1998. In 2001, he moved to FC Tokyo. He served as coach for top team and manager for youth team until 2011. In 2012, he moved to his old club Júbilo Iwata and became a coach under manager Hitoshi Morishita. In May 2013, manager Morishita was sacked for poor results. Nagasawa managed the club as caretaker manager in several matches until the club signed with new manager Takashi Sekizuka. In 2014, Nagasawa moved to J2 League club Fagiano Okayama and became a coach under manager Masanaga Kageyama. In 2015, Nagasawa became a manager as Kageyama successor. In 2016, Fagiano finished at the 6th place which was best place in the club history. He managed Fagiano until end of 2018 season. In 2019, he returned to FC Tokyo and became a coach under manager Kenta Hasegawa. Nagasawa also managed FC Tokyo U-23.

Club statistics

Managerial statistics
Update; December 31, 2018

References

External links
 
 
 jubilo-iwata.co.jp

1968 births
Living people
University of Tsukuba alumni
Association football people from Ehime Prefecture
Association football people from Osaka Prefecture
People from Matsuyama, Ehime
Japanese footballers
Japan Soccer League players
J1 League players
Japan Football League (1992–1998) players
Júbilo Iwata players
Honda FC players
Japanese football managers
J1 League managers
J2 League managers
J3 League managers
Júbilo Iwata managers
Fagiano Okayama managers
FC Tokyo U-23 managers
Association football midfielders